Synuchus congruus is a species of ground beetle in the subfamily Harpalinae. It was described by A. Morawitz in 1862.

References

Synuchus
Beetles described in 1862